The Henry Fawcett Memorial is a memorial fountain commemorating Henry Fawcett, installed during 1886 at the Victoria Embankment Gardens in London, United Kingdom. Mary Grant created the portrait relief and George Frampton produced the ornamental elements. Basil Champneys was the architect for the memorial. The memorial is listed at Grade II.

References

External links
 
 Monument: Henry Fawcett at London Remembers

Drinking fountains in the United Kingdom
Grade II listed buildings in the City of Westminster
Monuments and memorials in London
Outdoor sculptures in London
Victoria Embankment